Adam Broomberg (born 1970) and Oliver Chanarin (born 1971) are artists living and working in London.

Together they have had numerous international exhibitions. Their work is represented in major public and private collections. They were awarded the Deutsche Börse Photography Prize for their book War Primer 2, described as a "book that physically inhabits the pages of Bertolt Brecht's remarkable 1955 publication War Primer." They were awarded the International Center of Photography Infinity Award for their publication, Holy Bible.

Broomberg and Chanarin founded the imprint Chopped Liver Press to publish and sell their own books as well as those by other artists.

Broomberg was born in Johannesburg, South Africa and Chanarin was born in London.

Publications
Trust. London: Westzone, 2000.
Ghetto. London: Trolley, 2003.
Mr Mkhize's Portrait. London: Trolley, 2004. .
Chicago. SteidlMACK, 2006.
Fig. Göttingen: Steidl; Brighton: Photoworks, 2007. .
The Red House. Göttingen: Steidl, 2007.
People in Trouble Laughing Pushed to the Ground. London: Mack, 2011. .
War Primer 2. London: Mack, 2011. . Edition of 100 copies.
Digital edition. Mapp. A version of the printed book with essays about War Primer by Bertolt Brecht.
Paperback. London: Mack, 2018. .
SPBH Book Club Vol 1. London: Self Publish, Be Happy, 2012.
Holy Bible. London: Mack; AMC, 2013. .
Scarti. London: Trolley, 2013. .
Dodo. Mexico City: Editorial RM / JUMEX, 2014. .
Humans and Other Animals. London: Tate Publishing, 2015. 
Spirit is a Bone. London: Mack, 2015. .

Awards
2004: Vic Odden Award, Royal Photographic Society, Bath, England.
2013: Deutsche Börse Photography Prize, The Photographers' Gallery, London, for War Primer 2
2014: Infinity Award, International Center of Photography, New York City.

Exhibitions
British Art Show 8, Leeds; Edinburgh; Norwich; Southampton.
"Rudiments", Center for Contemporary Art, Ujazdowski Castle, Warsaw.
"Rudiments", Lisson Gallery, London.
Conflict, Time, Photography, Tate Modern, London, November 2014 – March 2015; Museum Folkwang, Essen, 10 April – 5 July 2015.
To Photograph the Details of a Dark Horse in Low Light, Foam Fotografiemuseum Amsterdam, Amsterdam, Netherlands.
Shanghai Biennale 2014, Shanghai.
Cross Section of a Revolution, Lisson Gallery, London.
New Photography 2013, Museum of Modern Art, New York City.
Tate galleries, London.
Apexart, New York City.
Gwangju Biennale, Gwangju, South Jeolla province, South Korea.
Stedelijk Museum Amsterdam, Amsterdam, Netherlands.
International Center of Photography, New York City.
Kunst-Werke Institute for Contemporary Art, Berlin.
The Photographers' Gallery, London.
Mathaf: Arab Museum of Modern Art, Doha, Qatar.
Dodo, Colección Júmex, Mexico City.
Divine Violence, Mostyn, Llandudno, north Wales, July–November 2014, included Broomberg & Chanarin's Afterlife.

Collections
Tate, London.
Museum of Modern Art, New York City.
Stedelijk Museum Amsterdam.
Victoria and Albert Museum, London.
Musée de l'Élysée, Lausanne, Switzerland.
International Center of Photography, New York City.
Art Gallery of Ontario, Toronto.
Galería NoguerasBlanchard, Madrid / Barcelona

Notes

References

External links
 
 2015 Interview with Chris Dercon in 032c Magazine
 2015 Interview with Magali Genuite in Double magazine
 2014 Interview with Adam Carr in Mousse Magazine
 2014 Adam Broomberg & Oliver Chanarin for frieze magazine 
 2014 Adam Broomberg & Oliver Chanarin for Tate Etc. magazine 
 2014 Interview with Sabine Mirlesse in BOMB magazine

Living people
Photographers from London
English contemporary artists
21st-century British artists
Art duos
Year of birth missing (living people)